Fergal Byron is a former Gaelic footballer for Laois from Ballybrittas.

A goalkeeper, he won a Leinster Senior Football Championship medal with Laois in 2003 and picked up an All-Star award in the same year. He also won a Leinster Under 21 Football medal as a corner back with Laois in 1994.

In 2005, he won an Interprovincial Championship medal with his province Leinster.

In November 2007, he announced his retirement from the inter county game. 

He was appointed Coaching and Games Officer for Laois GAA in 2017.

References

Announcement of retirement

1974 births
Living people
Courtwood Gaelic footballers
Gaelic football goalkeepers
Laois GAA
Laois inter-county Gaelic footballers